Mandan is a town and union council in Bannu District of Khyber Pakhtunkhwa. It is located at 32°56'46N 70°36'29E and has an altitude of 348 metres (1145 feet).

Its population concludes mostly Afghan tribes, which is migratesd several century ago. 

Its main union councils Khawaja Mad, Beri Khel, Sabo Khel, Metha Khel and others. Mandan are considered most brave, bold and worior nature. It has own police station at Kaki road. It is situated in the south east of Bannu city between the Dera Ismael Khan road and Luck road. The most popular Chakra Mandan road Lay's between the Mandan area.

References

Union councils of Bannu District
Populated places in Bannu District